James Milton Renegar Jr. (born May 14, 1955) is an American mathematician, specializing in optimization algorithms for linear programming and nonlinear programming.

Biography
In 1983 he received his Ph.D. in mathematics from the University of California, Berkeley. His Ph.D. thesis On the Computational Complexity of Simplicial Algorithms in Approximation Zeros of Complex Polynomials was supervised by Stephen Smale. After postdoc positions, Renegar joined in 1987 the faculty of the School of Operations Research and Information Engineering at Cornell University and is now a full professor there.

Renegar is a leading expert on optimization algorithms. In recent years, the focus of his research is devising new algorithms for linear programming. He has done research on 'interior-point methods for convex optimization (for which he wrote a well-known introductory monograph), quantifier elimination methods for the first-order theory of the reals, development of the notion of "condition number" in the context of general conic optimization problems, algorithms for hyperbolic programming, and most recently, the discovery of a simple paradigm for solving general convex conic optimization problems by first-order methods.' His 2001 monograph A Mathematical View of Interior-point Methods in Convex Optimization is intended to present a general theory of interior-point methods, suitable for a wide audience of graduate students in mathematics and engineering.

In 1990 Renegar was an invited speaker at the International Congress of Mathematicians in Kyoto. In 1995 he was a founding member of the nonprofit organization Foundations of Computational Mathematics. He was awarded the 2018 Khachiyan Prize.

James M. Renegar Jr. married Catharine M. Barnaby and is the father of two children, Alice and Nicholas James. James M. Renegar Sr. (1928–2005) practiced law in Oklahoma City for many years.

Selected publications

Articles
 
 
  1988(over 740 citations)
 
 
 
 
  (over 760 citations)

Books

References

External links
 

1955 births
Living people
20th-century American mathematicians
21st-century American mathematicians
American computer scientists
Numerical analysts
Theoretical computer scientists
University of California, Berkeley alumni
Cornell University College of Engineering faculty